Ronald Kotkamp (born 15 April 1972) is a former New Zealand cricketer. Kotkamp was a right-handed batsman who bowled right-arm fast-medium. He was born in Dunedin, Otago.

Kotkamp made his debut for Hertfordshire in the 2002 MCCA Knockout Trophy against the Essex Cricket Board, in what was his only Knockout Trophy match for the county. In that same season he made his only List A appearance against Bedfordshire in the 1st round of the 2003 Cheltenham & Gloucester Trophy which was held in 2002. In this match he scored 5 runs before being dismissed by Shaun Young, while with the ball he took the wicket of Neil Stanley for the cost of 39 runs.

As of 2010, he was back in New Zealand playing club cricket for Otago Country.

References

External links
Ronnie Kotkamp at ESPNcricinfo
Ronnie Kotkamp at CricketArchive

1972 births
Living people
Cricketers from Dunedin
New Zealand cricketers
Hertfordshire cricketers